Perfect North Slopes, is an alpine skiing resort in Southeastern Indiana. It consists of 5 magic carpets, 2 rope tows, and 5 chairlifts. The area has 23 trails, 1 of which is expert, 3 of which are most difficult, 2 of which are advanced intermediate, 12 of which are intermediate (including three terrain parks), and 5 of which are beginner. Lessons at this resort are available.

Trail list
Easiest : Cat Walk (Carpets), Rehearsal (Carpets), Callback (Carpets), Understudy (Carpets), Broadway (Green Chair), and Jam Session Beginner Terrain Park (Rope)

More Difficult : Back Stage (Red Chair), Tuff Enuff (Red Chair), Hoyt Connection (White Chair, Orange Chair), Clyde's Super Slide (Red Chair, White Chair, Orange Chair), Lower Hollywood Terrain Park (Red Chair), Audition Terrain Park (Blue Chair), The Meadow (Blue Chair), Jam Session (Rope), Ski Whiz (Green Chair), Rewind (Orange Chair), The Far Side (Orange Chair), and Runway (Orange Chair)

Advanced Intermediate : Intermission [Race Course] (Orange Chair) and Special Effects (Orange Chair) 

Most Difficult : Center Stage (Red Chair, White Chair), Deception (Red Chair, White Chair), Prime Time (Orange Chair) 

Experts Only : Hollywood (Red Chair) 

Tubing is also available to the right of Orange Chair.

Resort history
Perfect North was formed by the Perfect Family and others in 1980. Initially funded by the sale of cattle by Clyde & Ella Mae Perfect, it began with 2 handle tows and a rope tow on two ski runs on the "big" hill, as well as 2 rope tows on the bunny slope. In 1984, a chair was added where the "big" rope tow was, and another chair was added in 1985. In 1987, Perfect North added their third chairlift, which added one blue square and two black diamond ski runs. Eventually, they added two more chairs, including their 5th chair, which opened up 4 new ski runs. 

Perfect North did not allow snowboarding until 2002. It was one of the last ski resorts in America to still refuse snowboarders.

Perfect North was also where notable Olympic freestyle skier Nick Goepper got his start. Growing up about 15 minutes from the slopes, Nick used to spend up to 12 hours a day training at Perfect North before beginning his track to stardom and eventually competing in the Winter Olympic Games in Sochi, Russia.  Four years later, in Pyoeongchang, South Korea, Goepper excitedly asked "What's up, Perfect North?" to the camera after his first qualifying run in the slopestyle competition, scoring a 92.80. 

On November 20th, 2019, Perfect North purchased the land and assets of Timberline Four Seasons Resort in a Philadelphia bankruptcy court. The Timberline resort lies at the eastern slope of the Canaan Valley near Davis, West Virginia. Timberline, along with the neighboring Cannan Valley Ski Resort, receives an outsized amount of snow relative to the surrounding areas. Timberline had fallen into disrepair over the previous several years, suffering sporadic broken lifts and other infrastructure deficiencies. A new management team intends to revitalize the operation in time for the 2020-2021 ski season.

Activities
The Perfect North Slopes lodge has 3 sections: east, west, and main. The west lodge is the original lodge.  The main lodge and the East Lodge are later additions.  The first story of the main lodge has a small cafeteria.  On the second story of the east lodge, there is a small skiing and snowboarding shop.  Adjacent to the main ski area is a  tubing run which includes 3 sections and 23 lanes.

Perfect North Slopes has three terrain parks. There is an advanced terrain park and a beginner terrain park. The first advanced terrain park is lift serviced and usually includes three jumps and several rails. The second advanced terrain park is also lift serviced and includes several large jumps. The beginner terrain park is tow rope serviced and has access to beginner rails and small jumps.

Events
Perfect North hosts an abundance of local competitions and clinics throughout the season. Some of the events usually hosted are:
Small Terrain park clinics, the yearly Big Air competition (Held in the big terrain park,), the Mud Stash, and a Spring Carnival.

Food and beverage
Perfect North Slopes offers a variety of food and drinks in three different locations.

The Chow Corral (Located in the Main Lodge)
The Grill (Located on the Main Deck when Weather Permits on Weekends)
Slip-N-Slide Snack Shack (Located in the Snow Tubing Area)

References

External links

Buildings and structures in Dearborn County, Indiana
Ski areas and resorts in Indiana
Tourist attractions in Dearborn County, Indiana
1980 establishments in Indiana